David Baker (born 1965), is a male retired track cyclist who competed for England. He is not to be confused with the Cyclo-cross and mountain bike rider David Baker.

Cycling career
Baker was a National track champion over 1Km and 5Km in 1988.

He represented England in the 1 km time trial and points race, at the 1990 Commonwealth Games in Auckland, New Zealand.

References

1965 births
English male cyclists
Cyclists at the 1990 Commonwealth Games
Living people
Commonwealth Games competitors for England